Paul McRoberts (born November 15, 1992) is an American football wide receiver who is a free agent. He played college football at Southeast Missouri State. He signed with the Rams as an undrafted free agent in 2016.

College career
After attending Soldan International Studies High School in Missouri. McRoberts played college football at Southeast Missouri State as a standout wide receiver.

Professional career

Los Angeles Rams
After going undrafted in the 2016 NFL Draft, McRoberts signed with the Los Angeles Rams on May 4, 2016 as an undrafted free agent. On September 3, 2016, he was waived by the Rams as part of final roster cuts and was signed to the practice squad the next day. He was promoted to the active roster on December 23, 2016.

On September 2, 2017, McRoberts was waived by the Rams and was signed to the practice squad the next day. He was released on December 26, 2017.

Personal life
During the 2016 NFL preseason of his rookie year, McRoberts's 18-year-old step-brother, Paul, was murdered.

References

External links
 Southeast Missouri bio
 Los Angeles Rams bio

1992 births
Living people
Players of American football from St. Louis
Players of Canadian football from St. Louis
American football wide receivers
Southeast Missouri State Redhawks football players
Los Angeles Rams players
Saskatchewan Roughriders players